César Jiménez Jiménez (born 24 November 1977), sometimes known simply as César, is a Spanish retired footballer who played as a central defender.

He played almost exclusively with Real Zaragoza, in a career marred by injuries.

Club career
Born in Ávila, Castile and León, Jiménez was brought up through the Real Madrid youth academy, and played his first senior season with the C team in Segunda División B. In October 1998 he signed with Real Zaragoza, but represented mainly the reserves in his beginnings.

In 2000–01's 18th round, Jiménez made his La Liga debut in a 4–2 home win against CA Osasuna, and scored in the game. After the Aragonese's relegation the following campaign, he served a two-year loan at Segunda División club UD Almería.

Jiménez's Zaragoza career was blighted by injuries, as he only made 17 competitive appearances in five seasons. In a January 2005 match against Real Madrid, a tough challenge by Luís Figo would all but mean his untimely retirement, completed in March 2007.

Honours
Zaragoza
Copa del Rey: 2000–01

References

External links

1977 births
Living people
People from Ávila, Spain
Sportspeople from the Province of Ávila
Spanish footballers
Footballers from Castile and León
Association football defenders
La Liga players
Segunda División players
Segunda División B players
Real Madrid C footballers
Real Madrid Castilla footballers
Real Zaragoza B players
Real Zaragoza players
UD Almería players
Spain youth international footballers